Rainbow Blonde Records is an independent record label founded by José James, Talia Billig (aka Taali) and Brian Bender.
 The label was initially formed when James received the rights back to his first album The Dreamer from Brownswood Recordings, and grew to include original releases from a roster including artists Ben Williams, Taali, and Bright & Guilty.

History
Rainbow Blonde was founded by James and Billig in 2018 in New York City. The two met while Billig was working at Blue Note Records for Bruce Lundvall.

In building Rainbow Blonde, James and Billig worked to create a collective as much as a new record label. Rainbow Blonde's collective includes house photographer Janette Beckman, filmmaker Madelyn Deutch, business manager Kristin Lee and many others.

Taali's debut LP "I Am Here" was the first full-length original release for Rainbow Blonde in 2019. In February 2020, Ben Williams released his first LP on Rainbow Blonde with his critically acclaimed civil rights album "I Am A Man.". José James released his first new LP on Rainbow Blonde with his album No Beginning No End 2 in March 2020.

Discography

LPs
 The Dreamer (10th Anniversary Edition) (2018) – José James
 I Am Here (2019) – Taali
 I Am A Man (2020) – Ben Williams
 No Beginning No End 2 (2020) – José James 
 Blackmagic (10th Anniversary Edition) (2020) – José James
 José James: New York 2020 (Live) (2021) – José James
 When Did The World Start Ending? (Live at Levon Helm Studios) (2021) – Taali
 Merry Christmas from José James (2021) – José James
 On & On (2023) – José James
 taali (2023) – Taali

EPs
 Were Most Of Your Stars Out? (2019) – Taali
 Were You Busy Writing Your Heart Out? (2020) – Taali

Instrumental LPS
 No Beginning No End 2: Mentals (2020) – José James 
 I Am A Man: Mentals (2020) – Ben Williams
 I Am Here: Mentals (2020) – Taali
 Bright & Guilty: Mentals (2020) – Bright & Guilty

Singles/Remixes
 Soft Age (2019) – Bright & Guilty 
 STDs (2020) – Bright & Guilty 
 Soft Age (KoolKojak Remix) (2020) – Bright & Guilty
 Hear You Now (TR/ST Remix) (2020) – Taali
 High Road Pt. 2 (Natasha Diggs and Ian Wallace Remix) (2020) – Ben Williams

See also 
 List of record labels

References 

American record labels
Record labels established in 2018
American independent record labels
Jazz record labels
Electronic music record labels
Companies based in New York City